Woman of 9.9 Billion is a 2019 South Korean television series starring Cho Yeo-jeong, Kim Kang-woo, Jung Woong-in, Oh Na-ra and Lee Ji-hoon. It aired on KBS2's Wednesdays and Thursdays at 22:00 (KST) time slot from December 4, 2019 to January 23, 2020.

Synopsis
The story of an unfortunate woman named Jeong Seo-yeon who finds herself with 9.9 billion won.

Cast

Main
 Cho Yeo-jeong as Jeong Seo-yeon
 Kim Kang-woo as Kang Tae-woo
 Jung Woong-in as Hong In-pyo
 Oh Na-ra as Yoon Hee-joo
 Lee Ji-hoon as Lee Jae-hoon

Supporting
 Seo Hyun-chul as Oh Dae-yong
 Kim Do-hyun as Seo Min-gyoo
 Goo Seong-hwan as Black Bear
 Gil Hae-yeon as Jang Geum-ja
 Yoo Young-jae as Kim Seok
 Shin Su-hyun as Ji Ha-na
Hyun Woo as Kang Tae-hyun
 Ok Ye-rin as Lee Yoo-ri, Hee-joo and Jae-hoon's daughter

Production
The first script reading took place in August 2019.

Ratings
In this table,  represent the lowest ratings and  represent the highest ratings.

Notes

References

External links
  
 
 
 
 

Korean Broadcasting System television dramas
2019 South Korean television series debuts
2020 South Korean television series endings
Korean-language television shows
Television series by Victory Contents